Heaven Forbid is the thirteenth studio album by American hard rock band Blue Öyster Cult, released on March 24, 1998. It was the band's first studio album with new material in a decade (not counting the 1992 soundtrack to Bad Channels). American science fiction and horror writer John Shirley wrote lyrics to most of the songs on the album. While he is primarily known as an author for his cyberpunk stories, many of the lyrics on this album revolve around early science fiction and mystery motifs. The album's working title was 'Ezekiel's Wheel,' after the Biblical story that some take to reference an early visitation by UFOs.

The album's live song "In Thee" was originally featured on Mirrors. "Still Burnin'" is a sequel to the song "Burnin' for You", which appeared on Fire of Unknown Origin.

The inspiration for the alternative cover is Morgan Fairchild. This image also appears on the reverse of the insert, and was originally intended to be the front piece as indicated by advertisements from the period.

"Harvest Moon", "Power Underneath Despair", "Cold Gray Light of Dawn" and "Still Burnin'" were debuted live during the 1992 tour.

The album was re-released on April 17, 2020, by Frontiers.

Track listing

Personnel

Band members
Eric Bloom – guitars, keyboards, lead vocals on tracks 1, 3, 5, and 7, producer
Buck Dharma – guitars, keyboards, lead vocals on tracks 2, 4, 6, 8–11, producer
Allen Lanier – guitars, keyboards
Danny Miranda – bass guitar on tracks 1, 4–9, 11, backing vocals
Jon Rogers – bass guitar on tracks 2, 3 and 10, backing vocals
Bob Rondinelli – drums on track 9
Chuck Burgi - drums on tracks 1-8 and 10, backing vocals

Additional musicians
George Cintron – additional vocals
Tony Perrino – additional keyboards

Production
Steve Schenck - producer on tracks 2, 3, 10, management
Paul Orofino – engineer, mixing
Marc Senesac – engineer and mixing on tracks 2, 3, 10
Leon Zervos – mastering

References

Blue Öyster Cult albums
1998 albums
CMC International albums